The UAAP Season 78 Men's Football Final took place on 5 May 2016 at the Rizal Memorial Stadium. It was contested between UP Fighting Maroons and Ateneo Blue Eagles. UP won 4–1, with one goal from Daniel Gadia and a hat-trick from Kintaro Miyagi, to claim their sixth UAAP Football Championship final victory; Ateneo's goal was scored by Mikko Mabanag.

The men's and women's Final matches were on May 5, 2016, which was exactly eight months after the start of the season on September 5, 2015.

The UP Fighting Maroons dedicated their win for their teammate Rogie Maglinas who had just died of cancer.

Route to the Final
From the elimination round, Ateneo Blue Eagles and UP Fighting Maroons made to the Final Four with De La Salle Green Archers and UST Growling Tigers. In the playoffs, the number 1 seeded UP Fighting Maroons beat the number 4 UST Growling Tigers by a score of 3-0, while in the other match, number 2 seeded De La Salle Green Archers was beaten by their arch-rival and number 3 seeded Ateneo Blue Eagles via penalty shoot-out that makes Ateneo meet UP in the Championship match.

Bracket

Semifinals

Match

Summary
In the first half, at the 28th minute Kintaro Miyagi scored the first goal that gives UP a 1-0 lead, at the 34th minute Daniel Gadia gave UP a 2-0 lead, and at the 36th minute Mikko Mabanag scored a goal from a free kick for Ateneo.

Ihe second half, Kintaro Miyagi scored his second goal that gave UP a 3-1 lead, and in the 80th minute Miyagi made a hat trick to give UP a 4-1 lead, which was the final score.

Details

Match rules
90 minutes.
30 minutes of extra-time if necessary.
Penalty shoot-out if scores still level.
Seven named substitutes.
Maximum of three substitutions.

Broadcasting
The match was broadcast live on ABS-CBN Sports+Action on regular channel and ABS-CBN Sports+Action HD via cable TV and livestream.

Attendance
More than 9,000 watched this championship match in Rizal Memorial Stadium.

Men's football final